Giacomo Argente was an Italian painter of the Baroque period, specializing in portrait miniature. He was born in Ferrara in the 17th century, and was mainly active in Turin.

References

17th-century Italian painters
Italian male painters
Painters from Ferrara
Painters from Turin
Italian Baroque painters
Portrait miniaturists